William Neale may refer to:
 Bill Neale, Canadian figure skater
 Billy Neale (cricketer), English cricketer
 Billy Neale, English footballer (Darlington)
 William Neale (footballer), English footballer (West Bromwich Albion)
 William Johnson Neale, English barrister and novelist
 Sir William Neale, 1st Baronet, of the Neale baronets

See also
 William Neale Lockington, English zoologist
 William Neill (disambiguation)